Yicai may refer to:
Yicai, Prince Qing (1820−1866), prince of the Qing dynasty
China Business Network, or Yicai Media Group, Chinese media company